In computer science, Atropos is a real-time scheduling algorithm developed at Cambridge University. It combines the earliest deadline first algorithm with a best effort scheduler to make use of slack time, while exercising strict admission control.

External links 
 The Atropos Scheduler

Scheduling algorithms
Real-time computing